VPG may refer to:

VPg, a viral protein
Vaginal photoplethysmography, a measurement of vaginal vasocongestion
Value-Added Producer Grants, program authorized by the Agriculture Risk Protection Act of 2000c. 6401)
Vehicle Production Group, an American automobile manufacturer

Places 
Vacchi Piedmont Glacier, glacier in Victoria Land, Antarctica
Ventrapragada railway station, a railway station in India
Victoria Peak Garden, a Chinese style garden near the summit of Victoria Peak in Hong Kong
Victory Playground, Hyderabad, a playground in India
IATA airport code for Vipingo Ridge Airstrip in eastern Kenya

People 
V. P. Ganesan, a Sri Lankan trade unionist, politician, film producer and actor
V. P. Gangadharan (born 1954), Indian oncologist
Vasyl Panasovych Gogol-Yanovsky (1777–1825), Ukrainian playwright
Ved Prakash Goyal (1926–2008), Indian politician 
Veigar Páll Gunnarsson (born 1980), Icelandic football striker 
Vincenzo Patrick Guglielmelli (born 1987), Italian footballer